Wynn is a letter in the Old English alphabet. 

Wynn may also refer to:
 Wynn (given name)
 Wynn (surname)
 Wynn Resorts
 Wynn Las Vegas, in Las Vegas, Nevada, U.S.
 Wynn Macau, in Macau, People's Republic of China
 Wynn's, an automotive company owned by Illinois Tool Works

See also
 WYNN (disambiguation)
 Wynne (disambiguation)
 Wyn, a surname
 Wyne (disambiguation)
 Wynns (disambiguation)
 Winn (disambiguation)